Fleet railway station serves the town of Fleet in Hampshire, England. It is situated on the South West Main Line, which has four tracks through the station. There are two platforms on the outer pair of tracks, which are served by trains between London Waterloo and Basingstoke and Southampton. The centre pair of tracks have no platforms and are used by through-services.

The station, and all trains calling there, are operated by South Western Railway.

History
A station, originally named Fleet Pond (after Fleet Pond) was opened in May 1847. It was built on the opposite side of Minley Road as it is today. When the line was increased to four tracks, the station was rebuilt on its current site. At the time however, the station saw very little use and there were even proposals to close the station. It was renamed Fleet on 1 July 1869.

In 1906, the station was expanded again as the station became busier as Fleet's population grew. The buildings were rebuilt in 1969.  work was under way to replace the station buildings and deck the southern car park to provide an extra 150 spaces.  The new station building and footbridge were opened in July 2014 with the former lattice footbridge removed overnight on 23/24 July.

Services
The current Monday-Saturday off-peak service is:
3 trains per hour (tph) to London Waterloo, of which:
1 calls at Farnborough Main and Clapham Junction, taking 41 minutes.
1 calls at Farnborough Main, Brookwood, Woking, Weybridge, Walton-on-Thames, Surbiton and Clapham Junction, taking 56 minutes.
1 calls at all station as per the second layout above, minus Clapham Junction. This train is overtaken by the fast train and so should only be used to reach stations up to Surbiton.
2 tph terminating at Basingstoke, calling at Winchfield and Hook and taking 20 minutes.
1 tph to Poole, calling at Basingstoke, Winchester, Shawford, Eastleigh, Southampton Airport Parkway, Southampton Central, Totton, Ashurst New Forest, Brockenhurst, Sway, New Milton, Hinton Admiral, Christchurch, Pokesdown, Bournemouth, Branksome and Parkstone, taking 2 hours 36 minutes. This train should only be used for stations to Ashurst New Forest, Sway and Hinton Admiral. Brockenhurst, New Milton, Christchurch, Pokesdown, Bournemouth and Poole can be reached faster by changing at Southampton Central. Branksome and Parkstone can be reached faster by changing at Brockenhurst.
On Sundays this becomes:
1 tph to London, calling at Farnborough Main, Brookwood, Woking, Surbiton, Wimbledon and Clapham Junction, taking 1 hour 7 minutes. (When returning from London passengers should ensure they are in the front part of the train.)
1 tph to Basingstoke as above, taking 17 minutes.

Miscellaneous
In May 2010, the body of a newborn baby girl was found abandoned in a rubbish bin at the station. A murder investigation was opened based upon the baby's injuries.

The two platforms are numbered; Platform 1 is for London-bound trains, Platform 2 is for trains for Basingstoke (and beyond).

Notes

References

External links

Former London and South Western Railway stations
Railway stations in Hampshire
DfT Category C2 stations
Railway stations in Great Britain opened in 1847
Railway stations served by South Western Railway
1847 establishments in England
Fleet, Hart